Ducis may refer to:

 The genitive case of dux, the Latin word "leader" and for the title of "duke"
 Collingbourne Ducis, a small village in the English countryside
 The Duke University Center for International Studies

People:
 Jean-François Ducis (1733-1816), French dramatist
 Louis Ducis (1775-1847), French painter
 Ducis Rodgers (b. 1973), American sportscaster on WPVI-TV in Philadelphia